The Prague Chamber Choir (Pražský komorní sbor) is a Czech choir founded in Prague in 1990 by singers of the Prague Philharmonic Choir. It has performed concerts in Australia, Brazil, Israel, Japan, Lebanon and many European countries (e.g. Wexford Festival Opera, Rossini Opera Festival).

External links 
 

Czech choirs
Chamber choirs
Musical groups established in 1990
1990 establishments in Czechoslovakia